The Malaysian Squash Tour comprises several yearly professional squash PSA tournaments.

Results
These are the results from 2018 onwards:

2018

See also
 PSA World Tour
 WSA World Tour

References

PSA World Tour
WSA World Tour
Squash tournaments in Malaysia
Women's squash tournaments
Squash in Malaysia